Raner Christercunean Collins (born 1952) is a senior United States district judge of the United States District Court for the District of Arizona.

Education and career

Born in Malvern, Arkansas, Collins received a Bachelor of Arts degree from Arkansas Polytechnic College (now Arkansas Tech University) in 1973 and a Juris Doctor from the University of Arizona College of Law (now James E. Rogers College of Law) in 1975. He was a law clerk in the Pima County, Arizona Attorney's Office from 1975 to 1976, and then a trial attorney for that office until 1981. He was a city magistrate for the City of Tucson Court from 1981 to 1983, thereafter returning to Pima County Attorney's Office as a county attorney until 1985. He was a superior court judge pro tempore of the Pima County Superior Court from 1985 to 1988, and a superior court judge there from 1988 to 1998.

Federal judicial service

On May 11, 1998, Collins was nominated by President Bill Clinton to a seat on the United States District Court for the District of Arizona vacated by William Docker Browning. Collins was confirmed by the United States Senate on July 31, 1998, and received his commission on August 3, 1998. He became Chief Judge on September 3, 2013, succeeding previous Chief Judge Roslyn O. Silver who took senior status. He finished his term as Chief Judge on September 4, 2018. He assumed senior status on March 4, 2019.

Notable ruling

On January 11, 2011, following the death of Chief Judge John Roll in the 2011 Tucson shooting, Collins ordered that the judges of the District of Arizona, all of whom knew Roll well, could not preside over the prosecution of the alleged murderer.

See also 
 List of African-American federal judges
 List of African-American jurists

Sources

1952 births
Living people
African-American judges
Arkansas Tech University alumni
James E. Rogers College of Law alumni
Judges of the United States District Court for the District of Arizona
People from Malvern, Arkansas
Superior court judges in the United States
United States district court judges appointed by Bill Clinton
20th-century American judges
21st-century American judges